Kanal 5 (en:Channel 5) is a Croatian commercial television station operating in the city of Split.

It was founded in 2005 and its programming consists mostly of various talk shows dealing with local issues.

External links 

Kanal 5 (Croatia) at LyngSat Address

Television channels in Croatia
Mass media in Split, Croatia
Television channels and stations established in 2005
2005 establishments in Croatia